MasterChef Pinoy Edition is the Philippine version of the competitive cooking reality television series, MasterChef. The first season began on November 12, 2013, on ABS-CBN. The show is hosted by Judy Ann Santos-Agoncillo. Santos-Agoncillo is also joined by Chefs Fernando Aracama, Rolando Laudico and JP Anglo as the judges of the show.

The finale, dubbed as MasterChef Pinoy Edition: The Live Cook-Off, was aired live on February 9, 2013, at the SM North EDSA Skydome in Quezon City. Kris Aquino and Richard Gomez helped Santos-Agoncillo and the three chef-judges in judging. JR Royol, a band vocalist from Benguet was proclaimed as the winner of the show winning the million cash prize, a culinary scholarship from the Center of Asian Culinary Studies, and a kitchen showcase from Fujidenzo.

Auditions

Auditions were held nationwide.

Finalists and elimination results

References

External links

Pinoy Edition (season 1)
2012 Philippine television seasons
2013 Philippine television seasons